Elections to Colchester Borough Council were held on 2 May 2019. Seventeen members of the council (one-third of the whole) were up for election, one from each of the 17 wards.

Result Summary

Candidates by Party

Result

Composition
Prior to the election, the composition of the council was:

Following the election, the composition of the council was:

Ward results

The Statement of Nominated Persons was released on 4 April 2019 detailing the persons standing as candidates at the Borough Council election.

Incumbent councillors are marked with an asterisk*

Berechurch

Castle

Greenstead

Highwoods

Lexden & Braiswick

Marks Tey & Layer

Mersea & Pyefleet

Mile End

No Independent candidate as previous (−1.8).

New Town & Christ Church

No Independent candidate as previous (−2.3).

Old Heath & The Hythe

No Independent candidate as previous (−3.8).

Prettygate

Rural North

Shrub End

No Independent candidate as previous (−3.8).

St. Anne's & St. John's

No Independent candidate as previous (−3.5).

Stanway

Tiptree

Wivenhoe

References

2019 English local elections
2019
2010s in Essex
May 2019 events in the United Kingdom